St. Andrew's Church is a ruined church in Himarë, Vlorë County, Albania. It is a Cultural Monument of Albania.

References

Cultural Monuments of Albania
Buildings and structures in Himara
Churches in Vlorë County
Churches in Himarë